Fútbol Club Puente Tocinos is a football team based in Puente Tocinos in the autonomous community of Region of Murcia. The team played in Preferente Autonómica.

Its stadium is Municipal de Torresol with a capacity of 1,000 seats.

Season to season

2 season in Tercera División

External links
Official website

Football clubs in the Region of Murcia
Association football clubs established in 2007
Divisiones Regionales de Fútbol clubs
2007 establishments in Spain